Hypochalcia is a genus of snout moths. It was described by Jacob Hübner in 1825.

Species
 Hypochalcia ahenella (Denis & Schiffermüller, 1775)
 Hypochalcia balcanica Ragonot, 1887
 Hypochalcia decorella (Hübner, 1810)
 Hypochalcia dignella (Hübner, 1796)
 Hypochalcia fulvosquamella Ragonot, 1887
 Hypochalcia griseoaenella Ragonot, 1887
 Hypochalcia lignella (Hübner, 1796)
 Hypochalcia orbipunctella Ragonot, 1887
 Hypochalcia oxydella Ragonot, 1887
 Hypochalcia propinquella (Eversmann, 1842)
 Hypochalcia rayatella Amsel, 1959
 Hypochalcia staudingeri Ragonot, 1887

References

Phycitini
Pyralidae genera